James Mathews (June 4, 1805 – March 30, 1887) was an American lawyer and politician who was a two-term member of the United States House of Representatives from Ohio from 1841 to 1845.

Early life and career 
Matthews was born at Liberty, Trumbull County, Ohio.  After studying law he was admitted to the Ohio Bar in 1830.  He then moved to Coshocton, Ohio, where he practiced law. From 1832-1837 Mathews was a member of the Ohio State senate.

Congress 
In 1841 he was elected a member of the U.S. House of Representatives from Ohio's 13th congressional district which then covered Knox County, Ohio, Coshocton County, Ohio, Holmes County, Ohio and Tuscarawas County, Ohio.

In 1842 Mathews was re-elected from Ohio's 16th congressional district which only differed from the old 13th in that it did not include Knox County.  In 1844 Mathews did not run for re-election.

Later life
In 1855 Mathews moved to Knoxville, Marion County, Iowa.  From 1857-1859 he served as prosecuting attorney for this county.  He also latter served as a professor of pomology at Iowa State College (now Iowa State University) and Knoxville's postmaster.

Sources
 Congressional biography
 Parsons, Stanley B., William W. Beach and Dan Hermann. United States Congressional Districts, 1788-1841. Westport: Greenwood Press, 1978.
 Parsons, Stanley B., William W. Beach and Michael J. Dubin. United States Congressional Districts and Data, 1843-1883. Westport: Greenwood Press, 1986.

People from Trumbull County, Ohio
People from Coshocton, Ohio
People from Knoxville, Iowa
1805 births
1887 deaths
Ohio lawyers
Democratic Party Ohio state senators
Iowa State University faculty
Democratic Party members of the Ohio House of Representatives
19th-century American politicians
19th-century American lawyers
Democratic Party members of the United States House of Representatives from Ohio